Nepal conducted a widespread national census in 2011 by the Nepal Central Bureau of Statistics. Working with the 58 municipalities and the 3915 Village Development Committees at a district level, they recorded data from all the municipalities and villages of each district. The data included statistics on population size, households, sex and age distribution, place of birth, residence characteristics, literacy, marital status, religion, language spoken, caste/ethnic group, economically active population, education, number of children, employment status, and occupation.

Total population in 2011: 26,494,504
Increase since last census 2001: 3,343,081
Annual population growth rate (exponental growth): 1.35
Number of households: 5,427,302
 Average Household Size: 4.88
Population in Mountain: 6.73%, Hill: 43.00% and Terai: 50.27%.

Nepalese caste/ethnic groups
The population wise ranking of 126 Nepalese castes/ethnic groups as per 2011 Nepal census.

See also

 List of village development committees of Nepal (Former)
 1991 Nepal census
 2001 Nepal census
2021 Nepal census

Notes

References

External links
 Central Bureau of Statistics
 National Population and Housing Census 2011

Censuses in Nepal
Nepal